Evgeny Vasilievich Revenko (born May 22, 1972, Sovetskiy, Kupinsky District) is a Russian political figure and a deputy of the 7th State Duma and  8th State Dumas. 

In 1991, Revenko started working as a freelancer of the All-Union radio station "Youth". He left the position in 1995 to work for the VIDgital. From 1996 to 2000, he was a correspondent at the NTV. In 1996-1997, Revenko covered the First Chechen War, and in 1999, he prepared documentaries on the NATO bombing of Yugoslavia. At the beginning of the 2000s, Revenko worked at the Russia-1 TV channel. From 2005 to 2007, he worked as Deputy Director of the Department of Mass Communications, Culture and Education of the Government of Russia. From 2012 to 2016, Revenko was a Deputy General Director of the All-Russia State Television and Radio Broadcasting Company. Since 2016, Revenko was a deputy of the State Duma of the 7th and 8th convocations.

Revenko has been heavily criticized for his rather emotional and often fake coverage of the events, particularly the ones related to the Ukrainian politics.

References

1972 births
Living people
United Russia politicians
21st-century Russian politicians
Eighth convocation members of the State Duma (Russian Federation)
Seventh convocation members of the State Duma (Russian Federation)
People from Novosibirsk Oblast